Gernot Ludwig Windfuhr (born 2 August 1938 in Essen) is a retired professor from the University of Michigan, where he taught in the Department of Near Eastern Studies. He graduated from the Cologne Center of Language Sciences at the University of Cologne in 1962, in Iranian studies from the University of Tehran in 1961, and in Islamic studies, Iranian studies, and linguistics from the University of Hamburg in 1965.

Career
In 1967, Windfuhr joined the faculty of the Department of Near Eastern Studies at the University of Michigan as an assistant professor, after a year there as a visiting professor. He was promoted to associate professor in 1969, and became a full professor in 1973. From 1977 to 1987, he served as the head of the department, whereupon he was made professor emeritus.

Editorial boards
Consulting editor for linguistics – Encyclopædia Iranica
Editor – International Journal of Ancient Iranian Studies
Editor – Iranian Journal of Language Studies
Board of Consultants – Iranistik. Deutschsprachige Zeitschrift für iranistische Studien

Books

References

American Iranologists
1938 births
Living people
Writers from Essen
University of Cologne alumni
University of Tehran alumni
University of Hamburg alumni
University of Michigan faculty